True Brew may refer to:

True Brew (EP), by Millencolin, February 2015
True Brew (album), by Millencolin, April 2015
True BREW, a testing process in Binary Runtime Environment for Wireless
"True Brew", a 2000 episode Good Eats, and several similarly titled follow-up episodes